Lydia Rodríguez Fernández (born 1980 in Madrid), better known as Lydia, is a Spanish pop singer.

Career
When Lydia was 16 years old, she released her first album, Lydia, which went platinum in Spain. She became famous after dedicating a song to her musical idol Alejandro Sanz. In 1998 she released her second album, that became gold in Spain.

She represented Spain at the Eurovision Song Contest 1999 with the song "No quiero escuchar" (I don't want to listen), finishing last with one point. Her colorful dress, designed by Ágatha Ruiz de la Prada, attracted much attention and criticism from the Spanish media and spectators.

In 2002, she released her last album as solo singer. In 2007, she starred in the musical Jesus Christ Superstar in several Spanish cities and other projects. In 2008, she replaced Sole Giménez as singer for the Spanish multi-platinum band Presuntos Implicados. The first album that she released with this band, Será (It will be), was nominated for the Latin Grammy Awards 2009.

Discography

With Presuntos Implicados

Albums
2008 Será
2011 Banda Sonora

Singles
2008 Tu cómo estás
2008 ¿A dónde voy?
2011 Vuelvo a pensar en ti

Solo studio albums
1996 Lydia (x1 Platinum)
1998 Cien veces al día (x1 Gold)
1999 Cien veces al día, Edición Eurovisión (Eurovision Edition)
2002 Si no me pides la vida

Compilations
1999 Lydia: el tacto de tu piel y otros grandes éxitos (Greatest Hits)
2002 Discografía básica (Discography Box)
2003 Lydia: grandes éxitos (Best of)

Solo singles
1996 De la amistad al amor
1996 Fueron buenos tiempos
1996 El tacto de tu piel
1996 No sé si es amor
1997 Sin ti no puedo
1998 No sé vivir sin ti
1998 Cien veces al día
1998 Aún no quiero enamorarme
1998 Pienso en tí
1999 No quiero escuchar (Eurovision)
2001 Across the universe
2002 Esta vez no caeré
2002 A través de mi ventana
2002 Ansiedad
2002 Si no me pides la vida (with Nacho Campillo)

References 

1980 births
Living people
Singers from Madrid
Eurovision Song Contest entrants of 1999
Eurovision Song Contest entrants for Spain
Lydia
21st-century Spanish singers
21st-century Spanish women singers